Dame Jennifer Susan Murray,  (née Bailey; born 12 May 1950) is an English journalist and broadcaster, best known for presenting BBC Radio 4's Woman's Hour from 1987 to 2020.

Early life
Murray was born in Barnsley, West Riding of Yorkshire to Alvin Bailey and Winifred Jones, and attended Barnsley Girls' High School, a grammar school, leaving with A levels in French, English and History. She has a degree in French and Drama from the University of Hull.

Career
Murray joined BBC Radio Bristol in 1973 before becoming a reporter and presenter for regional TV news programme South Today. She was a newsreader and later one of the presenters of the BBC's Newsnight television show for two years from 1983, before moving to BBC Radio 4 to present Today. She took over from Sue MacGregor as presenter of Woman's Hour in 1987. She has presented BBC Radio 4's The Message and written for magazines and newspapers including The Guardian, Daily Express and the Daily Mail. She hosted her final Woman's Hour on 1 October 2020.

She has written several books, including:
 1996 – Woman's Hour, 50 years of British Women
 2003 – That's My Boy
 2003 – Is It Me, or Is It Hot in Here?: A Modern Woman's Guide to the Menopause 
 2009 – Memoirs of a Not So Dutiful 'Daughter''' 
 2011 - Ten Poems About Dogs 2011 – My Boy Butch: The heart-warming true story of a little dog who made life worth living again 2016 - A History of Britain in 21 Women 2017 – Woman's Hour: Words from Wise, Witty and Wonderful Women 2018 – A History of the World in 21 Women: A Personal Selection 2018 - Votes For Women!: The Pioneers and Heroines of Female Suffrage 2020 – Fat Cow, Fat Chance: The Science and Psychology of Size Personal life and views 
She was brought up a Christian in the Church of England. Though at the age of 14, just before visiting Auschwitz concentration camp, her father revealed he was Jewish by birth from his mother Edith Field (originally Feld). Murray subsequently wrote on 21st December 2022 in The Daily Mail and on Twitter  “Officially I have no claim to the Jewish faith, but I feel it deeply, and have done since the age of 14 when my father revealed to me what, until then, he had kept a closely guarded secret. I am not religious, but I feel my Jewish genes. They are part of my race. They took me to Israel in my early 20s, against the advice of my parents who were afraid for me, but I wanted to know more.” She spent a year working at the Frank Meisler sculpture gallery in Jaffa. She has also written of her abhorrence of racism “ young people need to understand the history of slavery and how it influences modern racism, they need to understand what lay behind the Holocaust and how it continues to affect the Jewish population”.  

Murray married her first husband Brian Murray aged 21; their marriage ended after six years. She later married David Forgham and the couple have two grown-up sons.

Murray has been criticised for her statements on transgender issues. Writing for The Sunday Times in March 2017, Murray penned an article headlined "Jenni Murray: Be trans, be proud – but don't call yourself a 'real woman'."

Health issues
On 21 December 2006 Murray announced, at the end of Woman's Hour, she had been diagnosed with breast cancer. She informed her audience that her prognosis was good; she did indeed return early in 2007. She reported that the most emotionally upsetting moment was losing her hair, and used this as an item on the centrality of hair to definitions of femininity. In 2020 Murray announced that she would demonstrate proper self-breast examination techniques on The Real Full Monty on Ice'' television program, alongside Linda Lusardi and Hayley Tamaddon.

Murray has been vocal and visible in the media with regard to her own experience of menopause, HRT and the importance of raising awareness of this aspect of women's health in the workplace and more generally 

In 2008 she had a hip replacement following avascular necrosis.

Honours
Murray was appointed Officer of the Order of the British Empire (OBE) for services to broadcasting in 1999 and Dame Commander of the Order of the British Empire (DBE) in the 2011 Birthday Honours.

In 2007 Murray was awarded a Doctor of Letters (DLitt) honorary degree from the University of St Andrews in recognition of Jenni Murray's major contribution to broadcasting, journalism and writing.

In March 2012 Murray was awarded an honorary degree from the University of Salford for contributions to the media industry and to the growing links between the University and its neighbours at Salford Quays.

On 5 November 2019 Murray was awarded a Doctor of Letters from the University of Chester, for outstanding contribution to journalism and broadcasting.

Charities
In November 2007 it was announced Murray had been named patron of British medical research charity Breast Cancer Campaign. She is also patron of the Family Planning Association, vice-president of Parkinson's UK and a supporter of Humanists UK.

References

1950 births
Alumni of the University of Hull
British feminists
British women journalists
British radio presenters
Living people
Dames Commander of the Order of the British Empire
People from Barnsley
BBC television presenters
British women radio presenters
Woman's Hour
20th-century British journalists
21st-century British journalists